Nesle is a railway station located in the commune of Nesle in the Somme department, northern France.  The station is served by TER Hauts-de-France trains on the line from Amiens to Laon.

History
Formerly, the station was also connected with secondary metre gauge rail lines:

 to Noyon via Bussy and Guiscard
 to Albert via Péronne

See also
List of SNCF stations in Hauts-de-France

References

Nesle
Railway stations in France opened in 1867